Striginiana pseudostrigina is a moth in the family Eupterotidae. It was described by Rothschild in 1917. It is found in the Democratic Republic of Congo.

Adults are similar to Striginiana strigina, but are paler and have the light area on the inner side of the postmedian band, as well as a row of arrow-head marks on the nervures joined into a band by intranervular lunules, instead of a double row of
dots on the nervures. Furthermore, the black antemedian band of the hindwings is narrower.

References

Moths described in 1917
Janinae
Moths of Africa
Taxa named by Walter Rothschild
Endemic fauna of the Democratic Republic of the Congo